Sebastian Volco (also known as Volco) (Buenos Aires, 1973) is an Argentine composer, musician, singer-songwriter and record producer. He is recognized as a multi-instrumentalist since he is a pianist, bassist, keyboardist, guitarist. He formed La Orquesta Metafísica, a rock supergroup that puts together influences from rock, tango, jazz, classical music and traditional Argentine rhythms plus the duo Volco & Gignoli with bandoneon player Pablo Gignoli (former member of the Fernández Fierro Typical Orchestra).

Recognized for his career in rock music, he also emphasizes his role as a composer of works for cinema, theater, performance and music for ballet.

History 

La Trova de Fin de Siglo

One of Sebastián Volco's main projects was the creation in 1997 with Sebastián Rosenfeldt of La Trova de Fin de Siglo, a group of experimental rock, improvised and electronic music. With this band he performed numerous concerts in Buenos Aires. During a year, he held a multitude of jam sessions at the now extinct concert venue Planeta Jupiter, where participated artists such as Charly García and Pappo, the legendary rock and blues guitarist.

In 1998, he ran the Evenos Club in association with the blues legend and rock pioneer Javier Martínez (member of the Manal group).

With La Trova de Fin de Siglo he recorded Reboot 144, an album composed for the contemporary dance work Other Parts of Brenda Angiel which was presented in 1997 at the Rojas Cultural Center in Buenos Aires.

Underground movement in Buenos Aires (1999-2012)

In the late 90s, he participated actively with contemporary music composers such as Santiago Santero, Gustavo Ribicic, Claudio Baron, among others.

Between 1999 and 2008, Sebastián Volco composed, recorded and produced in Buenos Aires 5 solo rock and pop albums. During this period, he directed several bands. In those albums a plenty of artists participated: Tweety González, Alina Gandini, Santiago Vázquez, Sami Abadi, Fernando Samalea, Emmanuel Cauvet, Gori to name a few.

At the beginning of the 2000s, as a producer, he was in charge of the first album of the Mataplantas band.

From 2007 to 2011, he was part of the punk-folk-psychedelic group Fantasmagoria. With this group, he toured Argentina and Uruguay in hundreds of live presentations. He was part of several of Pablo Dacal's bands and recorded the albums of La Orquesta de Salón, El Progreso and Baila sobre Fuego.

As a musician, he was part of several groups and participated in recordings with Pablo Dacal, Fena Della Maggiora, Javier Martinez, Mataplantas, La Trova de Fin de Siglo, Sami Abadi, Duo Candela, Santiago Santero, Gustavo Ribicic, Claudio Baroni, Pablo Krantz, Pat Coria, Salvet…

"Buena vida Delivery” is his most remarkable work as a composer of cinema, ballet and installations. This piece received the Astor Award at the Mar del Plata Film Festival in 2004. In 2001, he produced the music of the "Corte 7" installation at the Museum of Fine Arts in Buenos Aires.

For the work of contemporary dance Other Parts of Brenda Angiel, he recorded Reboot 144, a piece that he created with La Trova de Fin de Siglo and it was presented in 1997 at the Rojas Cultural Center in Buenos Aires.

La Orquesta Metafisica

In 2009, together with Sebastian Rosenfeldt, he formed La Orquesta Metafísica, an ensemble that shows the diversity of music in Buenos Aires: rock, tango, Jazz and classical music merged into an original sound.

With La Orquesta Metafísica he performed more than 100 concerts in Buenos Aires, France and New York. His debut album is a work composed by Volco called "7 Movements", where citizen music is mixed with philosophical and existential ideas and concepts. In 2014, The Metaphysical Orchestra set up its offices in France, where they continue to develop their multimedia shows, incorporating painters, dancers, photographers and filmmakers into the orchestra. In 2018, they released with the French label Tac Faubourg Du Monde, their second album Hypnotized.

Volco & Gignoli

In 2013, in association with Pablo Gignoli, he created the piano and bandoneon duo of modern tango "Volco & Gignoli" with whom he has made countless tours of Europe (France, Germany, Portugal, Switzerland, Luxembourg, Budapest, Poland), United Arab Emirates and the United States. Also with the duo he participated in tours and recordings with Gotan Project founders Muller and Makaroff.

The Volco Experience

At present, he develops the personal project “The Volco Experience”, a show where he plays the music of the Metaphysical Orchestra, songs, new instrumental compositions, electronic music and other experiments. 
Also continue composing and recording new material

Discography

As solo artist 
1999:Liquidándome en el agua
2001: Coqueteo electrónicos
2003: Pájaros sin patas    
2006: Ritual
2007: Fiebre de rock and Roll
2012: "Un regalo misterioso" 
2017: "Milagro y Arco Iris"
2017: "Suite descerebrada”
2020: "Selection of experimental,strange and beautiful ambient music ”
2020: "Civilizacion Demonio"
2020: "Living Inside"
2021: "Alien" (with Sebastian Rosenfeldt)
2022: "Awakening Ray"
2022: "The relentless advance of stupidity -chapter I"

With la Orquesta Metafísica 
 1995: La trova de fin de siglo
2011: "Orquesta Metafísica, 7 Movimientos"
 2018: "Hipnotizados" (Tac Faubourg Du Monde)

With Volco y Gignoli 
 2013: "Volco & Gignoli"
 2021: "Volco & Gignoli + Samalea"

External links 
 http://www.sebastianvolco.com
 http://www.orquestametafisica.com/
 http://www.volcogignoli.com/

Argentine composers
1973 births
Living people
Musicians from Buenos Aires